Koca Mustafa Pasha (died 1512) was an Ottoman statesman. He was grand vizier of the Ottoman Empire from 1511 to 1512. He was Roman (Rum) and probably not a devşirme.

Life
He started his career as kapıcıbaşı, that is "chief doorkeeper" of the Topkapi Palace: in this office he acted also as Master of Ceremonies at receptions of foreign ambassadors. He married a daughter of Sultan Bayezid II, Kamerşah Sultan, in 1491 and by her he had a daughter, Hundi Hanımsultan. Appointed Grand Vizier near the end of the reign of Bayezid II, he was executed in 1512. In Istanbul he let convert into mosques two ancient Byzantine churches, which were both named after him: respectively Koca Mustafa Pasha and Atik Mustafa Pasha Mosque.

References

Sources

16th-century Grand Viziers of the Ottoman Empire
Grand Viziers of Selim I
Year of birth unknown
Executed people from the Ottoman Empire
16th-century executions by the Ottoman Empire
People from the Ottoman Empire of Greek descent
Devshirme
1510s in the Ottoman Empire
1512 deaths